The Termites are a five-piece psychobilly musical group from Scotland, that formed in the 1980s.  Their most recent CD, Kicked In The Teeth on Crazy Love Records, was released in 2008.

History of the band 
The Termites formed during the mid-1980s in Kilmarnock - A town that was, at the time, rich in psychobilly music with bands such as The Longhorns.  It was with this band that the Termites first started out, supporting The Longhorns in Kilmarnock clubs. Initially a four piece of Kenny Mitchell (vocals), Scott Ballantyne (guitar), Ewin Murray (drums) and Gerry Doyle (electric bass), the band became known for powerful, and usually violent, live shows.

All four members of the band were brought up around the 'Tap Shoaps' (Top Shops) of Kilmarnock's housing scheme, New Farm Loch, and as a result, were as much a gang as a band. 

The band's recording career began in 1987 with the release of "Devil Call" on Fury Records' compilation Gypsy Girl. This was followed by a four track EP on Raucous Records in 1988. After live performances in the UK and Europe, the first album, Overload, came out in 1989 on Link Records. Other tracks appeared on many different compilation albums. Overload was recorded in Bracknell, England, with Chuck Flintstone behind the mixing desk. The album sessions were fraught with arguments and fist fights, but the album saw the light of day, released on the ‘Chuck Flintstone Presents’ series on Link Records. As the new album was being released, band members were leaving. The lineup changed throughout the late 1980s and early 1990s, leaving singer Kenny Mitchell as the sole original member. 

1991 saw the last gig in Irvine's 'Attic' nightclub. Ewin (the drummer) left the band within days of that gig and the Termites split.  However, an 18-year-old,  Jonny Fiddles, who attended that last gig and who was raised in the same area of New Farm Loch, Kilmarnock, would ultimately become the fifth member of the Termites in years to come.

From the mid-1990s, through to 2000 the members of the band went their separate ways. The turn of the century saw a reappearance of the Termites for a few one-off shows, but not with the original line-up. Vocalist Kenny Mitchell's relocation to Boston, Massachusetts, US, for several years ensured that the original band could not rise again. Kenny went on to become one of Scotland's most respected tattoo artists. He now works at Forevermore Tattoo Parlour in Glasgow.

In late 2005, original members Kenny Mitchell and Scott Ballantyne decided to bring the Termites back. Original drummer, Ewin Murray, also agreed and so the original three were back for the first time in 15 years.

This time, Matt Black, bass player from Kenny's previous band, The Hateville Heroes, joined as upright bass player. The band started touring again. 2006 also saw the re-release of the Overload album.

During the summer of 2006, an additional member was recruited to bring a fiddle to two new tracks, "Somebody's Gonna Pay", and "Bubblegum". Jonny Fiddles lived three houses from Kenny Mitchell. Jonny has remained in the band, now appearing on many of the new tracks.

The Termites signed to German record label Crazy Love Records in 2007, with a new album released September 2008 entitled Kicked In The Teeth.

Band members Ewin Murray and Jonny Fiddles (John Grant) now play in Scottish traditional music band the Borland Ceilidh Band. Fiddler John Grant additionally performs as a solo musician

Discography

See also
List of psychobilly bands

References

External links
The Termites Official Homepage
Forevermore Tattoo Parlour

British psychobilly musical groups
Rockabilly music groups